Jonathan Bullard (born October 22, 1993) is an American football defensive end for the Minnesota Vikings of the National Football League (NFL). He played college football at Florida and was drafted by the Chicago Bears in the third round of the 2016 NFL Draft, and has also played for the Arizona Cardinals and Seattle Seahawks.

Early years
Bullard attended Crest Senior High School in Shelby, North Carolina. As a senior, he had 82 tackles and 16 sacks. Bullard was a five-star recruit and was ranked as the best defensive end in his class. He committed to the University of Florida to play college football.

College career
Bullard played in all 13 games and made two starts as a true freshman at Florida in 2012. He had 27 tackles and 1.5 sacks. As a sophomore in 2013, he played in 11 games with eight starts and recorded 33 tackles and 1.5 sacks. He started all 12 games and had 52 tackles with 2.5 sacks his junior year in 2014. Bullard returned to Florida his senior season rather than enter the 2015 NFL Draft.

Professional career

Chicago Bears
Bullard was drafted in the third round (72nd overall) by the Chicago Bears in the 2016 NFL Draft. He signed his rookie contract on June 6, 2016. He made his NFL debut on September 11 against the Houston Texans. On October 9, Bullard recorded his first sack of his career, taking down Indianapolis Colts' Andrew Luck. He finished his rookie season with one start in fourteen games, recording eighteen tackles and a sack.

Bullard recorded his first career pass break-up on September 28, 2017, as well as a tackle against the Green Bay Packers. On October 29, he logged his first forced fumble against the New Orleans Saints, stripping running back Mark Ingram II In a blowout loss to the Philadelphia Eagles, Bullard got his first and only sack of the 2017 season, bringing down quarterback Carson Wentz on November 26. He finished his second season with three starts, recording 26 tackles, a sack, and two pass breakups. 
Bullard was waived during the final roster cuts on August 31, 2019.

Arizona Cardinals
On September 1, 2019, Bullard was claimed off waivers by the Arizona Cardinals. He was placed on injured reserve on December 6, 2019, with a hamstring injury. He finished the season with 22 tackles and 1.5 sacks through nine games and six starts.

On April 3, 2020, Bullard re-signed with the Cardinals. On September 5, Bullard was released during final roster cuts. He was re-signed to the practice squad a day later.

Seattle Seahawks
On October 7, 2020, Bullard was signed to the active roster of the Seattle Seahawks off the Cardinals' practice squad. He was placed on the reserve/COVID-19 list by the Seahawks on January 9, 2021, and activated on January 21.

Atlanta Falcons
On April 1, 2021, Bullard signed a one-year contract with the Atlanta Falcons.

Minnesota Vikings
On June 2, 2022, Bullard signed with the Minnesota Vikings. He was placed on injured reserve on December 10, 2022. He was activated on January 7, 2023.

References

External links
Chicago Bears bio
Florida Gators bio

1993 births
Living people
People from Shelby, North Carolina
Players of American football from North Carolina
American football defensive ends
American football defensive tackles
Florida Gators football players
Arizona Cardinals players
Atlanta Falcons players
Chicago Bears players
Seattle Seahawks players
Minnesota Vikings players